The 2017–18 CERS Cup is the 38th season of the CERS Cup, Europe's second club roller hockey competition organized by CERH.

Format 
All the thirty two teams will play a double-legged knockout tournament with the only rule of avoiding that two teams from the same nation play together in the first round.

Teams 
Thirty two teams from eight national associations qualified for the competition and were confirmed on 19 September 2017. League positions of the previous season shown in parentheses.

Bracket
The draw was held at CERH headquarters in Lisbon, Portugal, on 23 September 2017.

Round of 32
The first leg was played on 4 November and the second leg on 23 November 2017.

|}

Round of 16
The first leg was played on 9 December 2017 and the second leg on 13 January 2018.

|}

Quarterfinals
The first leg will be played on 17 February 2017 and the second leg on 10 March 2018.

|}

Final Four
The Final Four will be played on 28 and 29 April in Lleida, Spain.

Bracket

Semifinals

Final

See also
2017–18 CERH European League
2017 CERH Continental Cup
2017–18 CERH Women's European Cup

References

External links
 CERH website
  Roller Hockey links worldwide
  Mundook-World Roller Hockey

World Skate Europe Cup
CERS Cup
CERS Cup